John Haste is an American politician serving as a member of the Oklahoma Senate from the 36th district. He assumed office on November 16, 2018.

Early life and education 
Haste was born in Arkansas and raised in West Tennessee. He studied pharmacy at the University of Tennessee at Martin in 1972 and 1973 and business at the University of Louisiana at Monroe in 1978 and 1979.

Career 
Since the early-1990s, Haste has worked in sales, marketing, and business management. He is the senior vice president for business development at Surya, a home furnishing company based in Tulsa, Oklahoma. Haste was elected to the Oklahoma Senate in 2018 and assumed office on November 16, 2018.

Personal life 
Haste lives in Broken Arrow, Oklahoma and has one son. He is a Baptist.

References 

Living people
Republican Party Oklahoma state senators
People from Arkansas
People from Broken Arrow, Oklahoma
21st-century American politicians
Year of birth missing (living people)